Noah Walker Mullins (May 23, 1918 – October 31, 1998) was an American football running back, quarterback and defensive back in the National Football League. He played for the Chicago Bears and New York Giants. He played college football for the Kentucky Wildcats.

References

1918 births
1998 deaths
American football running backs
American football quarterbacks
American football defensive backs
Chicago Bears players
New York Giants players
Kentucky Wildcats football players
People from Midway, Kentucky
Players of American football from Kentucky